is a Japanese bobsledder who has competed since 1999.

Performance
 Finished 15th in the two-woman event at the 2006 Winter Olympics.
 Finished 20th in the two-woman event at the 2007 FIBT World Championships in St. Moritz.
 Finished 1st in the All Japan Bobsleigh Championships in Dec. 2009. (Hino has finished 1st in this competition every year since 2002)
 Finished 16th in the 2010 Olympic Games in Vancouver.

References

 
 
 
 Bobsleighsport.com profile

External links
  
 blog

1980 births
Living people
Japanese female bobsledders
Bobsledders at the 2006 Winter Olympics
Bobsledders at the 2010 Winter Olympics
Olympic bobsledders of Japan